Chance is the eighth album by American soul and gospel singer Candi Staton. Singles released from the album included "When You Wake Up Tomorrow" (co-written by Patrick Adams and Wayne K. Garfield), and the title track, which became a top 20 R&B record. The album peaked at No. 23 on the US R&B Album chart and No. 129 on the Billboard 200.

Track listing
Side 1
"I Ain’t Got Nowhere to Go" (Ronald Miller, Kenny Lewis, Howard Jennings) – 3:46
"When You Wake Up Tomorrow" (Patrick Adams, Ken Morris, Candi Staton, Wayne Garfield) – 6:41
"Rock" (Candi Staton, Jimmy Smith) – 7:16

Side 2
"Chance" (Candi Staton, Wayne Garfield, Jimmy Smith) – 5:31
"I Live" (Nickolas Ashford, Valerie Simpson) – 5:10
"Me and My Music" (Patrick Adams, Ken Morris, Candi Staton, Margie Smith) – 5:50

Musicians
Candi Staton - vocals
Richard Taninbaum, Christopher Parker, Steve Jordan – drums
Norbert Sloley, Carol Coleman, Francisco Centeno - bass guitar
Eddie Colon, Michael Lewis, Errol "Crusher" Bennett - percussion
Thom Bridwell - acoustic piano
Patrick Adams - Fender Rhodes
Philip Woo - synthesizer
Jimmy Smith - keyboards
Stan Lucas, Ken Mazur, Cornell Dupree, Ronald Miller, Emanuel "Rahiem" LeBlanc, Hiram Bullock, Jeff Mironov - guitar
Arrangers: Patrick Adams & Ken Morris (Rhythm), Ray Chew (Strings & Horns)
Background Singers (except “I Ain’t Got Nowhere to Go”): Alfonso Thornton, Carole Sylvan & Michelle Cobbs
Sam Burtis, Harold Vick, George Opalisky, Howard Johnson, Mike Lawrence, Virgil Jones, Gerald Chamberlain, Randy Brecker, Michael Brecker, Barry Rogers - horns

Production

Producers: Candi Staton & Jimmy Simpson 
Recorded at Sigma Sound Studios, New York
Recording and Mixing Engineer: Andy Abrams
Additional Recording Engineers: Carmine Rubino & Steve Tose
Assistant Engineers: Craig Michaels, Matthew Weiner, Carla Bandini & John Potoker
Mastered at Columbia, New York by Stuart J. Romaine
Album Art Direction: Peter Whorf
Photography: Mario Casilli

References

1979 albums
Warner Records albums
Candi Staton albums